The New York State Association of Independent Schools Athletic Association (NYSAISAA) is a sports association for independent schools in New York state. It is overseen by the New York State Association of Independent Schools. The Association conducts championships in various sports each year, some of which serve as qualifiers for overall state championships conducted with public and catholic schools.

List of schools
As of July 1, 2015, the following schools were members in good standing. All schools are located in the New York City borough of Manhattan unless otherwise noted.

 Abraham Joshua Heschel School
 Albany Academies in Albany
 Berkeley Carroll School in Park Slope, Brooklyn
 Brearley School
 Buffalo Seminary in Buffalo
 Chapin School
 Collegiate School
 Columbia Grammar & Preparatory School
 Convent of the Sacred Heart
 Cristo Rey New York High School
 Dalton School
 Doane Stuart School in Rensselaer
 Dwight School
 Ethical Culture Fieldston School in Manhattan, New York and Riverdale, Bronx
 Friends Academy in Locust Valley
 Friends Seminary
 Green Meadow Waldorf School in Chestnut Ridge
 Hackley School in Tarrytown
 Harley School in Rochester
 Harvey School in Katonah
 Horace Mann School in Riverdale, Bronx
 Immaculata Academy in Hamburg
 Kew-Forest School in Forest Hills, Queens
 Knox School in St. James
 Lawrence Woodmere Academy in Woodmere
 Léman Manhattan Preparatory School
 Long Island Lutheran Middle and High School in Brookville
 Loyola School
 Lycée Français de New York
 Martin Luther High School in Maspeth, Queens
 Marymount School
 Nichols School in Buffalo
 Nightingale-Bamford School
 Northwood School in Lake Placid
 Notre Dame School
 Packer Collegiate Institute in Brooklyn Heights, Brooklyn
 Park School of Buffalo in Amherst
 Poly Prep Country Day School in Dyker Heights and Park Slope, Brooklyn
 Portledge School in Locust Valley
 Riverdale Country School in Riverdale, Bronx
 Rye Country Day School in Rye
 SAR High School in Riverdale, Bronx
 Schechter School of Long Island in Glen Cove
 School of the Holy Child in Rye
 Spence School
 Staten Island Academy in Staten Island
 Stony Brook School in Stony Brook
 Trevor Day School
 Trinity School
 Tuxedo Park School in Tuxedo Park
 United Nations International School
 Waldorf School of Garden City
 Xavier High School
 York Preparatory School
 The Birch Wathen Lenox School

Sports offered
NYSAISAA offers championship competition in the following sports:

Fall:
 Cross-country (boys and girls)
 Field hockey (girls)
 Soccer (boys and girls)
 Volleyball (girls)

Winter:
 Basketball (boys and girls)
 Indoor track and field (boys and girls)
 Squash (boys and girls)
 Swimming (boys and girls)
 Wrestling (boys)

Spring:
 Baseball (boys)
 Golf (boys)
 Lacrosse (boys and girls)
 Softball (girls)
 Track and field (boys and girls)
 Volleyball (boys)

Championship teams
Results through Winter 2020.

Fall sports:

Winter sports:

Starting in the 2004-05 season, basketball championships were awarded by divisions. Class AA, Class A and Class B champions qualified for the New York State Federation Tournament of Champions.

Spring sports:

See also
The following independent school sport leagues are also in New York state:
Ivy Preparatory School League
ISAL - Independent Schools Athletic League (New York)
GISAL - Girls Independent Schools Athletic League 
PSAA - Private School Athletic Association
New York state high school boys basketball championships

External links
nysais.org

References

High school sports associations in New York (state)